La luna is the fifth studio album by Italian singer Noemi, released on 9 February 2018 by Sony Music and produced by Diego Calvetti.

The album was preceded by the singles "Autunno", released in September 2017 and written by Thegiornalisti's frontman Tommaso Paradiso and Dario Faini, and "I miei rimedi", a reworked version of a song previously recorded by Italian band La Rua, released in December 2017. 
La luna was launched during the 68th Sanremo Music Festival, in which Noemi competed with the album's third single, "Non smettere mai di cercarmi", placing 14th. An additional single, "Porcellana", was released in April 2018.
Tricarico, Giuseppe Anastasi and Diego Calvetti also appear as songwriters on the tracks of La luna. The album also features a cover of the song "Domani" by singer-songwriter Lucio Dalla.

The sound of La luna combines Noemi's traditional style—mainly inspired by Italian cantautori and blues—with electronic influences, previously explored in her album Made in London.

To promote the album, Noemi also performed live across Italy for her La luna tour, which started in May 2018. In 2019, La luna received a Lunezia Award in the section Stil Novo Award.

Track listing

Charts

References

2018 albums
Noemi (singer) albums
Sony Music Italy albums
Italian-language albums